The Queens Bohemians was an American soccer club based in Queens, New York that was a member of the American Soccer League.

Year-by-year

Men's soccer clubs in New York (state)
Defunct soccer clubs in New York City
American Soccer League (1921–1933) teams
Sports in Queens, New York